Harry Van Den Ham (born 16 August 1954) is a Dutch professional football manager and former player.

Playing career
Van den Ham played for UVV Utrecht in his youth and from the age of 11 began playing for USV Elinkwijk. With Elinkwijk, he became Dutch champions with the Sunday amateurs in 1974. In 1975, he switched from the amateurs to professional football. Van den Ham subsequently played in the Netherlands for FC Utrecht, SC Cambuur, FC Den Bosch, DS '79 and PEC Zwolle. In 1980, he was briefly playing for the Tulsa Roughnecks in the United States. In Belgium he also played for Berchem Sport.

In 1985, Van den Ham began playing with the Utrecht-based amateur association USV Holland. At the age of 34, Van den Ham made his comeback in the Eredivisie for VVV in 1988. From 1990, he played for another year for VC Vlissingen, after which he retired from his active professional career.

Managerial career
Van den Ham started his coaching career in 1992 as an assistant at RKC. In 1994, he became an assistant coach of FC Utrecht and subsequently he was head coach at SHO, Telstar and USV Holland, respectively. From 2000, he was the head coach of FC Dordrecht for two years and then for three years of TOP Oss.

In 2005, Van den Ham again became an assistant coach at FC Utrecht. In 2007, he was appointed by IJsselmeervogels as successor to the departing Cees Lok, but after six months the contract was dissolved due to a difference of opinion. In the 2011–12 season, he temporarily took over the tasks of the ill Theo Bos at FC Dordrecht. In the 2013–14 season he became the head coach of FC Dordrecht. He was succeeded by Ernie Brandts.

On 23 May 2014, Van den Ham was added to FC Utrecht's technical staff. He succeeded Jan Everse in August 2015 as head coach of FC Dordrecht.

In February 2020, van den Ham again took over as caretaker manager of FC Dordrecht after Claudio Braga was dismissed from the position after 14 months in charge. He was fired on 10 November 2020, after a 5–1 loss to FC Eindhoven, as Dordrecht were placed last in the league.

Career statistics

Club

Notes

Managerial

References

1954 births
Living people
Sportspeople from Bandung
Dutch footballers
Association football forwards
USV Elinkwijk players
FC Utrecht players
SC Cambuur players
FC Den Bosch players
FC Dordrecht players
Tulsa Roughnecks (1978–1984) players
K. Berchem Sport players
PEC Zwolle players
VVV-Venlo players
VC Vlissingen players
Eredivisie players
Eerste Divisie players
North American Soccer League (1968–1984) players
Expatriate soccer players in the United States
Dutch expatriate sportspeople in the United States
Expatriate footballers in Belgium
Dutch expatriate sportspeople in Belgium
FC Hilversum players
SC Telstar managers
TOP Oss managers
IJsselmeervogels managers
USV Elinkwijk managers
FC Dordrecht managers
Eerste Divisie managers